Markaz Knowledge City is a private, planned city built near Kozhikode in Kerala. The foundation stone for the project was laid by Taj-ul Ulama Sayyid Abdurrahman Albukhari on 24 December 2012. Sheikh Abubakr Ahmad is the chairman of the city and Abdul Hakeem Azhari is its Managing Director.

Education 
 School of Business Management
 Markaz International School

Digital Bridge International 
Alif Global School
Avaan Institute of Management Education and Research (AIMER Kozhikode)
Hillsinai Center of Excellence 
Hillsinai Finishing School
WIRAS (World Institute for  Research in Advanced Studies)
Malaibar Foundation
Malabar and Islamic heritage Museum
Library and research club and publications 
Markaz Unani Medical College, the first unani medical college in Kerala.

Markaz Law College 

Markaz Law College is a centre of higher legal education in Kozhikode. The college is affiliated to the University of Calicut and is recognized by the Bar Council of India. It offers integrated five-year course BBA with Bachelor of Laws and three-year course LLB.

Health care 

 Markaz Unani Medical Hospital
 Tigris Valley
 5 Star Wellness Center

Others 

Fezinn Hotels
M Tower
Valencia Galleria - Exhibition Centre
Talenmark Souk
Cultural Centre
Mihras Hospital
Unani Medical College
Aimer Business School
Tigris valley - Wellness Centre
Alif Global School
Malaibar Centre for Research and Development

Location 
It is located at National Highway 766 (India).

Transportation
Knowledge city connects to other parts of India through Kozhikode city on the west and Thamarassery town on the east. National highway No.66 passes through Kozhikode and the northern stretch connects to Goa and Mumbai. The southern stretch connects to Cochin and Trivandrum. The eastern National Highway No.54 going through Adivaram connects to Kalpetta, Mysore and Bangalore. The nearest airports are at Kozhikode and Kannur.  The nearest railway station is at Kozhikode.

See also
 Kanthapuram A. P. Aboobacker Musliyar
 Markaz College of Arts and Science
 Markaz Law College
 Shahre Mubarak Grand Masjid
 Markazu Saqafathi Sunniyya
 Markaz, Dubai

References 

Markaz
Thamarassery area
Villages in Kozhikode district